Montezuma is a city in Macon County, Georgia (ZIP code 31063). The population was 3,047 at the 2020 census, down from 3,460 in 2010. It is home to the armory of Bravo Company, 648th Engineers of the Georgia Army National Guard.

History
Montezuma had its start in 1851, when the railroad was extended to that point. The city was named after the famous Aztec leader by soldiers returning from the Mexican–American War. It was incorporated in 1854.

Montezuma is home to a thriving Mennonite community, founded when 10 to 15 Mennonite families moved from Virginia in the 1950s.

Geography
Montezuma is in south-central Macon County, on the east side of the Flint River. It is bordered to the west across the river by Oglethorpe, the Macon county seat. Several state highways converge in Montezuma. State Route 26 (Walnut Street) passes through the south side of the city, leading east  to Hawkinsville and west past Oglethorpe  to Ellaville. State Route 90 passes through the center of Montezuma, leading southeast  to Vienna and northwest  to Rupert. State Route 49 also passes through the city center, leading northeast  to Marshallville and southwest  to Andersonville.

Demographics

2020 census

As of the 2020 United States census, there were 3,047 people, 1,276 households, and 898 families residing in the city.

2000 census
As of the census of 2000, there were 3,999 people, 1,501 households, and 1,050 families residing in the city. The racial makeup of the city was 28.03% White, 69.84% African American, 0.20% Native American, 0.38% Asian, 0.70% from other races, and 0.85% from two or more races. Hispanic or Latino of any race were 1.40% of the population.

There were 1,501 households, out of which 34.3% had children under the age of 18 living with them, 36.7% were married couples living together, 29.8% had a female householder with no husband present, and 30.0% were non-families. 27.4% of all households were made up of individuals, and 13.1% had someone living alone who was 65 years of age or older. The average household size was 2.60 and the average family size was 3.20.

In the city, the population was spread out, with 29.1% under the age of 18, 9.8% from 18 to 24, 24.1% from 25 to 44, 22.3% from 45 to 64, and 14.8% who were 65 years of age or older. The median age was 36 years. For every 100 females, there were 81.7 males. For every 100 females age 18 and over, there were 74.7 males. The median income for a household in the city was $23,022, and the median income for a family was $27,469. Males had a median income of $26,226 versus $16,995 for females. The per capita income for the city was $12,168. About 21.8% of families and 25.6% of the population were below the poverty line, including 45.1% of those under age 18 and 17.1% of those age 65 or over.

Education
Education is provided by the Macon County School District.  Macon County Middle School, and Macon County High School, are both located in Montezuma.

Notable people
 Jim Colzie, baseball player in the Negro leagues

References

External links
 
 CityTown.info

Cities in Georgia (U.S. state)
Cities in Macon County, Georgia